Mattias Wigardt (born 28 June 1986) is a Swedish male badminton player.

Achievements

BWF International Challenge/Series
Men's Singles

Men's Doubles

 BWF International Challenge tournament
 BWF International Series tournament
 BWF Future Series tournament

References

External links
 

1986 births
Living people
Swedish male badminton players